Choro Mbenga is a Gambian football coach and former player, who is the current manager of Gambian team , and assistant coach of the Gambia women's national football team.

Personal

Career
Mbenga played for Gambian team Red Scorpions FC as a goalkeeper. In 2011, Mbenga hosted a Confederation of African Football women's football coaching course in Addis Ababa, Ethiopia. From 2014–15, she was the Gambia Football Federation's women's football co-ordinator. Whilst in the role, she organised Gambia's first women's football festival, for girls aged between 6 and 12 in Yundum.

Mbenga has worked as head coach of Red Scorpions FC, and as an assistant coach of the Gambia women's national football team, and the Gambia women's national under-17 football team. She is the only Gambian woman with a FIFA B grade licence. She led the Red Scorpians to second place in the 2009 Division One League Championship. In 2016, Mbenga and her assistant Dodou Faye were suspended for attacking a referee. She was a coach of Gambian and Red Scorpians footballer Fatim Jawara, who died in 2016 after trying to cross the Mediterranean Sea. Mbenga also guided Red Scorpions to the 2019 Division One League Championship.

References

Gambian football managers
Living people
Women's association football goalkeepers
Gambian women's footballers
Female association football managers
Year of birth missing (living people)